Oscar Passo (born May 13, 1980) is a Colombian retired footballer who played as a defender. 

He began his career with Real Cartagena in 1998, playing once until transferring to Deportes Tolima in 1999. With Tolima, he won the 2003 league title, before leaving the club in 2005. In 2006, he joined Atlético Nacional, and won two titles in the 2007 Apertura and 2007 Finalizacion. in 2009, he rejoined Real Cartagena and retired the following year.

He has been capped seven times by the Colombia national team, playing for them at the 2005 Gold Cup and in the 2006 FIFA World Cup qualifiers against Uruguay, Chile, and Peru.

Honours

Deportes Tolima 
Categoria Primera A: 2003

Atletico Nacional 
Categoria Primera A: 2007 Apertura, 2007 Finalizacion

External links
 

1980 births
Living people
Colombian footballers
Real Cartagena footballers
Deportes Tolima footballers
Atlético Nacional footballers
Categoría Primera A players
Colombia international footballers
2005 CONCACAF Gold Cup players
Association football defenders
People from Cesar Department